Watts and Yuille Warehouses, also known as Brightleaf Square, are two historic tobacco storage warehouses located at Durham, Durham County, North Carolina.  They were built in 1904, and are two identical buildings parallel to each other with a courtyard in between.  They are two-story Romanesque style brick structures, seven bays wide and twenty bays long.  Each unit of the warehouses is 75 feet by 118 feet, for a total of 35,400 square feet on each floor.  They are an example of "slow burn" masonry and wood factory construction. They were among the 12 brick tobacco storage warehouses erected by The American Tobacco Company trust beginning in 1897.  The buildings have been converted to retail and office use.

It was listed on the National Register of Historic Places in 1984.

References

External links
Brightleaf Square website

Tobacco buildings in the United States
Historic American Engineering Record in North Carolina
Industrial buildings and structures on the National Register of Historic Places in North Carolina
Romanesque Revival architecture in North Carolina
Industrial buildings completed in 1904
Buildings and structures in Durham, North Carolina
National Register of Historic Places in Durham County, North Carolina